The 2010 Santiago prison fire occurred in the San Miguel prison in Santiago, Chile on 8 December 2010, in which 81 inmates were killed, making it the country's deadliest prison incident.

The fire broke out at 5:30am Chile Daylight Time (8:30am GMT) on the fourth floor during a fight between rival gangs. An improvised flamethrower was reportedly used, setting mattresses and other flammable material alight. Those killed were trapped behind closed gates.

Local firefighters took around three hours to bring the fire under control.

At least 81 inmates were reported killed, and 14 suffered life-threatening burns, according to the Health Minister Jaime Mañalich. One firefighter and two prison guards also suffered lesser injuries. According to Chile's Fundacion Paz Ciudadana, the prison's capacity is 892, but was heavily overcrowded with 1,654 inmates. An investigation found out there was not a suitable emergency procedure in place.

During the fire at a prison in Santiago, Chile, though the fire occurred at 5:30, the firefighters were not informed until 5:48 when they received an emergency call from inside the prison. Once they were notified, 60 inmates had to be evacuated immediately to ensure the firefighters could quickly be in control of the fire. The situation was difficult, since the prison held 1,900 prisoners, which is double the number that the prison was originally designed to hold. Chile’s prison system is more than seventy percent over its maximum capacity. The fire occurred on visiting day, so about 5,000 relatives were gathered outside when word of the deaths spread. When the prison police director began to read survivors’ names over a megaphone, the relatives thought he was identifying the dead and some began to burst into tears or screaming, some fainting, and others throwing stones. Many family members waited for hours before receiving an update on their loved ones. Some visitors pressed their faces up against the fence and called out to inmates still inside. Some of the inmates managed to put their hands though the bars of their cell windows and waved T-shirts and bedsheets to show their relatives that they were still alive.  Along with the 81 inmates killeded, and the 14 that suffered from injuries, 11 prison guards and 1 firefighter were also injured as a result from this tragedy. Inside the prison there were only 6 guards, 26 of the guards remained outside. It was reported that many of the prison guards had prevented firefighters from entering the prison once they had arrived.

The incident prompted Chile's president Sebastián Piñera to launch an investigation and he called for an end to the overcrowding in the country's prison system, saying: "We cannot keep living with a prison system which is absolutely inhumane. We are going to speed up the process to ensure our country has a humane, dignified prison system that befits a civilised country."

See also

Comayagua prison fire

References

2010 in Chile
2010 fires in South America
Fires in Chile
Arson in South America
Mass murder in 2010
History of Santiago, Chile
Prisons in Chile
December 2010 events in South America
2010s in Santiago, Chile
Prison fires
2010 disasters in Chile